Gungahlin Drive is an arterial road in Canberra, Australia. This high quality section was built as the major part of the Gungahlin Drive Extension project.

Route description
The route begins at roundabout that forms the end of Clarrie Hermes Drive, and Horse Park Drive. It heads in a roughly south-easterly direction, passing by several suburbs, and becoming dual carriageway to the east of Gundaroo Drive. It then crosses between the Mulanggari and Gungaderra Grasslands and heads in a southerly direction along the western edge of the  industrial area. It then switches to a southwesterly heading and crosses over the Barton Highway, the interchange at this location also marks the transition to the start of the Gungahlin Drive Extension, built to parkway standards.

Junctions
Gungahlin Drive has multiple junctions along its length providing access to suburbs and facilities in the Gungahlin and Belconnen districts as well as the Inner North, there are links to several other arterial roads.

See also

References

Streets in Canberra
Roads in the Australian Capital Territory